In British English, the thinking man's crumpet or thinking woman's crumpet is a humorous term for a person who is popular with the opposite sex because of their intelligence and their physical attractiveness.

The expression is derived from the slang use of the term "crumpet" to refer to a woman who is regarded as an object of sexual desire.

Usage
The first person to be called "the thinking man's crumpet" was Joan Bakewell, by humourist Frank Muir, following her appearances in highbrow television discussion programmes such as BBC2's Late Night Line-Up. Bakewell is still synonymous with the phrase, but it has subsequently been applied to other high-profile women such as Anne Gregg, Joanna Lumley, Kate Bush and Felicity Kendal, and, more recently, Helen Mirren, Jennifer Saunders, Lucy Worsley and Gillian Anderson. In a poll in the Radio Times in 2003, Nigella Lawson received the most votes to be the readers' "thinking man's crumpet", with Carol Vorderman in second place.

Almost half a century after Muir deployed the term, Bakewell (by then Baroness Bakewell and a Dame of the British Empire) remarked that "it has taken me a lifetime to live it down. It was meant as a compliment I suppose, but it was a little bit of a put-down".

Actors Benedict Cumberbatch, Colin Firth and Bill Nighy have been repeatedly called by the press "the thinking woman's crumpet", as has historian Michael Wood.

After the release of the 1997 film Titanic, Kate Winslet was dubbed by one newspaper as "the sinking man's crumpet". 

Stewart Lee uses the phrase "crumpet man's thinker" in his stand-up, referring to Andrew Graham-Dixon.

References

English phrases
Slang terms for women
Slang terms for men